Sathya Vaakku is a 1990 Indian Tamil-language film, directed by R. Aravindraj and produced by Ramavasudevan. The film stars Prabhu, Shobhana, and Ramya Krishnan.

Cast
Prabhu 
Shobhana 
Ramya Krishnan
Tara
Nassar 
Vinu Chakravarthy

Soundtrack
The music was composed by Kiyaan Varma.

Reception
The Indian Express wrote "the film survives only because of its low-light photography, nicely choreographed suspense sequences [..] and a high decibel background score".

References

1990 films
1990s Tamil-language films
Indian action thriller films
Films directed by R. Aravindraj
1990 action thriller films